Nicholas Chiari (born February 18, 1993), commonly known by his stage name Grabbitz, is an American record producer, musician, composer, and DJ. In July 2014, he first gained widespread attention in the EDM community with the release of "Here With You Now", which has more than six million views on YouTube as of December 2017.

In July 2017, Grabbitz made Rolling Stone's list of 10 New Artists You Need To Know and received accolades from Billboard for "Contemplate," the 2017 single with Savoy.

Discography

Studio albums

Extended plays

Singles

As lead artist

As featured artist

Guest appearances

Remixes

Notes

References

American DJs
American electronic musicians
Dubstep musicians
1993 births
Living people
Monstercat artists
Hopeless Records artists
Electronic dance music DJs